The solo discography of Anna Tsuchiya features four studio albums, two compilation albums, two extended plays, two remix albums and 18 singles. These have all been released through Avex Group sublabel Mad Pray records, except for Nana Best, which was released under Cutting Edge.

Studio albums

Extended plays

Compilation albums

Live albums

Remix albums

Singles

As a lead artist

As a collaborating artist

Promotional singles

Video albums

Other appearances

Notes

References

Discographies of Japanese artists
Rock music discographies